Sinéad Majella Griffin (born 1986) is an Irish physicist working at Lawrence Berkeley National Laboratory on high energy physics and condensed matter. She won the 2017 Swiss Physical Society Award in General Physics.

Early life 
Griffin was born in 1986 in Dublin, Ireland.

Education 
Griffin studied physics at Trinity College, Dublin, graduating in 2008 with a bachelor's degree in theoretical physics. She moved to Imperial College London for her master's studies, working with Ray Rivers on topological defects in condensed matter and cosmology. She worked at University of California, Santa Barbara for her doctoral studies, studying superconductors and spintronics with Nicola Spaldin. When Nicola Spaldin joined ETH Zurich, Griffin accompanied her, earning a PhD in 2014 looking at the Hubbard model for hexagonal manganites. During her PhD she tested the Kibble–Zurek mechanism in YMnO3. She won the 2015 Materials and Processes (MaP) Award for the best interdisciplinary thesis at ETH Zurich.

Career 
In 2015 Griffin joined Jeffrey Neaton's laboratory at Lawrence Berkeley National Laboratory. She was awarded the 2017 Swiss Physical Society award in General Physics for her contributions to material theory. She recognised that multiferroic hexagonal manganites exhibited the same symmetry as those proposed shortly after the Big Bang, testing phenomena that occur on galactic scales with those that occur in a laboratory. She is interested in the symmetry-breaking conditions that lead to topological defects. She was an invited speaker at the 2018 Massachusetts Institute of Technology Rising Stars in Physics Workshop.

In 2016 she won the Falling Walls lab Bay Area competition looking for future breakthroughs. She has appeared in the Uncharted: Berkeley Festival of Ideas. Griffin is also an artist, and has exhibited her work in Ireland, Zurich, London and San Francisco.

References 

1986 births
Living people
Irish physicists
Irish expatriates in England
Irish expatriates in Switzerland
Alumni of Trinity College Dublin
Alumni of Imperial College London
ETH Zurich alumni
Lawrence Berkeley National Laboratory people